Alex Sheedy (born 17 November 1992) is an Australian basketball player who played for Fresno State in the United States' NCAA.  She competed for Australian Institute of Sport in the Women's National Basketball League (WNBL).

Basketball
Sheedy played junior basketball in Moe, Victoria. She played for the Australian Institute of Sport in the Women's National Basketball League during the 2010/2011 season. She played in a 24 November 2010 loss to the Canberra Capitals. She was a member of Victoria Country's u-18 women's basketball team. As a member of the squad she competed at the 2008 national championships held in Ballarat, Victoria from 5 to 12 July.

Fresno State statistics

Source

References

1992 births
Living people
Australian women's basketball players
Australian expatriate basketball people in the United States
Australian Institute of Sport basketball (WNBL) players
Forwards (basketball)
Fresno State Bulldogs women's basketball players
Sportswomen from Victoria (Australia)
People from Moe, Victoria